Reekara is a rural locality in the local government area (LGA) of King Island in the North-west and west LGA region of Tasmania. The 2016 census recorded a population of 26 for the state suburb of Reekara.

History 
Reekara was gazetted as a locality in 1960. It is believed to be an Aboriginal word for “a long (boat) row”.

Geography
The waters of the Southern Ocean form the western boundary, and Bass Strait the eastern.

Road infrastructure 
Route B25 (North Road) runs through from south to north.

References

Towns in Tasmania
King Island (Tasmania)